Piotr Samiec-Talar (born 2 November 2001) is a Polish professional footballer who plays as a forward for Śląsk Wrocław.

Senior career

Samiec-Talar began his career with Śląsk Wrocław. In 2018 he started training with the first team, making his first team appearance coming on as a substitute in the 5–0 away win against Miedź Legnica.

International career

Samiec-Talar has played for the Poland U18's team, having made his youth international debut against Macedonia in a 1–0 win.

References

External links

2001 births
Living people
Polish footballers
Poland youth international footballers
Association football forwards
Śląsk Wrocław players
Widzew Łódź players
GKS Katowice players
Ekstraklasa players
I liga players
II liga players
III liga players
People from Środa Śląska